Erin Densham (born 3 May 1985 in Camden, New South Wales, Australia) is an Australian professional triathlete and bronze medallist in the 2012 Olympics.

Early life
Erin Densham attended the Ruse Public School and the John Therry Catholic High School. She holds a degree in Fitness (Certificate III) and lives in St Kilda, Victoria, Australia.

Career
In 2008, Densham competed in the 2008 Beijing Olympics and came 22nd. In 2009, Densham was seriously hampered by heart problems and glandular fever. In Des Moines (Hy-Vee) Densham had to be dragged from the water.

In 2010, Densham is also one of the many international elite guest stars representing French clubs at the prestigious French Club Championship Series Lyonnaise des Eaux. At the opening circuit in Dunkirk on 23 May 2010, for instance, Densham placed 2nd and thus was the best triathlete of Poissy Tri, which thanks to her won the Dunkirk club ranking.

ITU competitions
In the seven years from 2004 to 2010, Densham took part in 44 ITU competitions and achieved 22 top ten positions, amongst which were eight gold medals.

Gallery

References

External links

 Triathlon Australia
 
 
 
 

Australian female triathletes
1985 births
Living people
Olympic bronze medalists for Australia
Triathletes at the 2008 Summer Olympics
Triathletes at the 2012 Summer Olympics
Olympic triathletes of Australia
Olympic medalists in triathlon
Medalists at the 2012 Summer Olympics
Triathletes at the 2016 Summer Olympics
20th-century Australian women
21st-century Australian women